Maude Amelia Morris, née Lyon (died 1961) was a Liberian women's rights activist and rubber farmer.

Life
Maude Lyon was the daughter of the US Resident Minister to Liberia, Ernest Lyon. In 1907 she married John Lewis Morris (1882-1935), who later served as Liberian secretary of state under Daniel E. Howard in the 1920s.

In 1920 she founded the National Liberian Women Social and Political Movement (NLWSPM), to press for women's involvement in Liberian government. However, President Charles D. B. King opposed the organization on the grounds that it amounted to the "Americanizing" of Liberian women. In 1932 Morris apparently tried again to organize women, heading a group which petitioned the national legislature to amend the constitution and establish female suffrage. "This was likewise treated with laughter and contempt".

In 1924 Morris bought some young rubber trees from the Firestone plantation at Harbel. After they were successfully planted at the family homestead near Monrovia, a family rubber farm soon started to expand. After her husband died in 1935, her eldest son Harry L. Morris returned to Liberia to help carry on the farm. By 1954 the family had moved to live near Kakata. The farm consisted of almost 3,000 acres, and rubber sales grossed over $100,000 per year.

In 1945 Morris was among Liberia's delegation to the San Francisco Conference which established the United Nations.

British administrative reports painted a vivid picture of Morris in the late 1940s:

She died in her seventies in 1961.

References

Year of birth missing
1880s births
1961 deaths
Liberian women's rights activists
Liberian farmers
Americo-Liberian people
Liberian women farmers
Liberian women activists